is a private university in Kagoshima, Kagoshima, Japan. The predecessor of the school was founded in 1932, and it was chartered as a junior university in 1950. In 1960, it became a four-year college.

References

External links
 Official website

Educational institutions established in 1932
Private universities and colleges in Japan
Universities and colleges in Kagoshima Prefecture
1932 establishments in Japan